The 1968 BYU Cougars football team was an American football team that represented Brigham Young University (BYU) as a member of the Western Athletic Conference (WAC) during the 1968 NCAA University Division football season. In their fifth season under head coach Tommy Hudspeth, the Cougars compiled an overall record of 2–8 with a mark of 1–5 against conference opponents, finished seventh in the WAC, and were outscored by a total of 247 to 179.

Schedule

Roster

References

BYU
BYU Cougars football seasons
BYU Cougars football